Armigers is a hamlet on the B1051 road in the Uttlesford district of Essex, England.  It is located midway between Thaxted and Broxted.

Hamlets in Essex
Uttlesford